Balbir Singh born in 1896 at Katra Garba Singh, Amritsar, was a Sikh scholar and brother of Bhai Vir Singh.

Early life and education
His father Dr Charan Singh expired at his early age of 12. He was brought up by his elder brother Vir Singh whom he called as his father. After his primary education in Amritsar he studied M.Sc. from Govt. College Lahore. He went to England and obtained his Ph.D. degree in Chemistry from University of London. In 1923 he returned to India.

Works
After coming back Singh did not join Govt. service as was arranged for him . He took up his first assignment as Principal of Cambridge Preparatory School at Dehradun in 1925 which he continued to serve till 1935. He joined as Director of P& S Bank in 1937. He was promoted to Managing Director in 1947 which post he continued to hold till 1960.

Literary works
Singh had lot of literary interests and wanted always to help his brother in his works. He started writing history of Singh Sabha Movement and published Charan Hari Visthar a life history of his family and father in two volumes. He also helped his brother Bhai Vir Singh in compilation of Guru Granth Kosh. He has been a scholar and author of many books on Sikh religious philosophy in Punjabi and English. He owned a large collection of rare books numbering about 1000 at his residence in Dehradun known as Panchbati, which has been converted into a memorial library and art gallery in his name. Some of his important published works  are:
Charan Hari Visthar 2 Volumes
Kalam dee Karamat
Lambi Nadar
Shudh Saroop
Ragmala da Swal
Kavi Jodh
Kavi Aalam (English)
Message of Guru Gobind Singh and other Essays
Nirukat Sri Guru Granth Sahib

Nirukta Sri Guru Granth Sahib
It is an encyclopaedic dictionary of Guru Granth Sahib. This was an important project started by him. He published the first volume in his lifetime and continue his work for the second volume till his death on 1 October 1974, when he had already given the second volume to press after final editing. Further Punjabi University Patiala has published four more volumes as per guidelines established by him. A quarterly literary magazine Panchbati Sandesh was also started by him, which has been continued by her daughter Mohinder Kaur and subsequently by Punjabi University Patiala.Balbir Singh Sahitya Kendra a memorial library and art gallery has been established at the residence of Singh in Dehradun which has been donated to Punjabi University Patiala. The work of publishing remaining volumes on Nirukat has been entrusted to this library.

References

Scholars of Sikhism
Sikh writers
1896 births
1974 deaths